Michael Ampadu (born 15 November 1997) is a Ghanaian professional footballer who plays as defender for Ghanaian Premier League side Legon Cities FC.

Club career 
Ampadu played for Liberty Professionals for four seasons from 2016 to 2020. He later moved to Legon Cities in 2020 in the club's bid to bolster their squad ahead of the 2020–21 Ghana Premier League season. The club signed other players including Jonah Attuquaye, Baba Mahama and Asamoah Gyan.

International career 
Ampadu was a member of the Ghana U23 national team in 2019. He was called up into the team by Ibrahim Tanko and he played for Ghana during the 2019 Africa U-23 Cup of Nations qualifiers.

References

External links 
 
 

Living people
1997 births
Ghanaian footballers
Association football defenders
Liberty Professionals F.C. players